The following events occurred in March 1943:

March 1, 1943 (Monday)
The U.S. Office of Price Administration implemented rationing of canned goods, which had been barred from retail sale since February 20.  Under the new rules, American consumers would be allowed 48 ration points worth, per person, per month of canned and bottled fruits, vegetables, soups, baby food and dehydrated fruit, while canned meats and fish remained unavailable.  On the average, the affected canned goods would count for 12 points apiece.
In the heaviest single air raid on the Nazi German capital, Royal Air Force and U.S. Army Air Force bombers struck Berlin in a 30-minute raid.  German radio conceded that at least 89 people were killed and 213 injured.  By the end of the week, the radio reported 486 dead and 377 seriously injured.
The Koriukivka massacre took place in the Ukrainian SSR when the 6,700 residents of the city of Koriukivka,  became victims of the German SS.  After burning down the buildings in town, the SS troopers killed the survivors.  
Risto Ryti was inaugurated for a second term as President of Finland, and urged citizens to keep fighting for the Axis powers.
The Nazi collaborationist Belarusian Central Council was established.
Born: Richard H. Price, American physicist, in New York City

March 2, 1943 (Tuesday)
The Battle of the Bismarck Sea began. U.S. and Australian forces sank a convoy of Japanese ships, taking out all 8 troop transports and 4 escorting destroyers.  Nearly 2,900 Japanese servicemen were killed over three days.  The convoy had been discovered serendipitously the day before when Lt. Walter Higgins of the U.S. Army descended to a lower altitude while flying over the Pacific in a Liberator bomber.
In a single day, 1,500 Jewish men, women and children were deported from Berlin after the citywide roundup three days earlier, and sent to the Auschwitz concentration camp; 1,350 of them were executed upon their arrival at Auschwitz.
The drama film The Human Comedy starring Mickey Rooney was released.
Born: 
Peter Straub, American author, in Milwaukee 
Elaine Brown, African-American activist, leader of Black Panther Party, in Philadelphia 
Tony Meehan, British drummer (The Shadows), in Hampstead (d. 2005)

March 3, 1943 (Wednesday)
A panic during an air raid killed 62 children and 110 adults in London who were trying to enter an air-raid shelter at the underground (subway) station at Bethnal Green, and another 90 were injured.  Survivors reported that the stampede was triggered when a woman tripped and fell while descending the stairs, and an elderly man fell over her body, and then 300 more people were caught in the crush. The woman who tripped was rescued, but the baby she had been carrying suffocated.  The trigger for the fleeing of residents to the station had been the noise from the launching of British defensive weapons, a salvo of anti-aircraft rockets from Victoria Park.
Captain Hans Joachim Schwantke then ordered U-43 to depart, under orders not to rescue the survivors because of the Laconia incident. Only one of the 365 people on board, Fritz Kuert, survived. Kuert, who had been able to escape safely from three other sinkings of ships, endured for 26 days with almost no food or water, was rescued on March 29 by the Spanish ship Campamor.
Mohandas K. Gandhi ended his fast after 21 days, drinking a glass of orange juice brought to him in prison by his wife, Kastubni.
"Why Have I Taken Up the Struggle Against Bolshevism", an open letter by Andrey Vlasov, was published in the newspaper Zarya.
The Josef von Báky-directed fantasy comedy film Münchhausen premiered in Germany.
Born: Trond Mohn, Scottish-born Norwegian billionaire, in Buckie
Died: Edward FitzRoy, 73, British Conservative politician and Speaker of the House from 1928 until his death

March 4, 1943 (Thursday)
As part of The Holocaust in Bulgarian-occupied Greece, almost all Jews in the region were rounded up to be taken to Treblinka extermination camp.
The 15th Academy Awards ceremony was held in Los Angeles. Mrs. Miniver won Best Picture. Greer Garson won Best Actress and gave what is probably the longest acceptance speech in Academy Awards history at almost six minutes. 
Operation Ochsenkopf in Tunisia ended in Axis offensive failure.
The three-day Battle of Fardykambos between Greek partisans and the Italian Army began.
The German submarine U-333 shot down a Wellington bomber with anti-aircraft fire directed at the plane's Leigh light, and the U-87 was sunk in the Atlantic Ocean by Canadian warships.
Born:  
Lucio Dalla, Italian singer and songwriter, in Bologna (d. 2012) 
Zoltan Jeney, Hungarian composer, in Szolnok (d. 2019)

March 5, 1943 (Friday)
The Allied strategic bombing campaign known as the Battle of the Ruhr began with an opening raid by 412 RAF aircraft on the Krupp munitions factory at Essen.
The Universal Horror film Frankenstein Meets the Wolf Man starring Lon Chaney, Jr. and Bela Lugosi was released.
Born: Lucio Battisti, Italian singer and songwriter, in Poggio Bustone (d. 1998)

March 6, 1943 (Saturday)

Major General George S. Patton, Jr. took command of the U.S. Army II Corps, replacing Major General Lloyd Fredendall in the North African campaign and reorganizing the Corps.  Patton, "recognized as the Army's foremost expert on tank fighting" was soon promoted to lieutenant general.  
Soviet Premier Joseph Stalin promoted himself to the rank of Marshal of the Soviet Union, while the Communist Party proclaimed him to be "the greatest strategist of all times and all peoples".
The Battle of Blackett Strait was fought in the Pacific. U.S. warships sank the Japanese destroyers Murasame and Minegumo. 
The Battle of Medenine was fought in Tunisia, resulting in a costly failure for the Axis. It was the last battle commanded by Erwin Rommel in North Africa.
"I've Heard That Song Before" by Harry James and His Orchestra hit #1 on the Billboard singles chart.
Died: Jimmy Collins, 73, American baseball player elected to the Hall of Fame in 1945

March 7, 1943 (Sunday)
The Polish government-in-exile reported for the first time about the executions of prisoners in a Nazi German "murder camp" at Oswiecim, known in Germany as Auschwitz.
Mohammed Ali Jinnah was re-elected as President of the Muslim League in British India.  
Prince Franz Joseph II of Liechtenstein married Countess Gina von Wildczek.  The monarch of the neutral mountain principality received congratulations from the Allied and the Axis powers.

March 8, 1943 (Monday)
The Battle of Sokolovo began on the Eastern Front, marking the first time that a foreign military unit, the First Czechoslovak Independent Field Battalion, fought alongside the Red Army.
The German submarine U-156 was depth charged and sunk east of Barbados by a Consolidated PBY Catalina of the U.S. Navy.
Born: Lynn Redgrave, English stage and film actress, in Marylebone (d. 2010)

March 9, 1943 (Tuesday)
German field marshal Erwin Rommel was summoned back to Berlin and placed on medical leave, on orders of Adolf Hitler, following the failure of the German counterattack at Medenine.
Şükrü Saracoğlu formed the new government of Turkey, becoming Prime Minister again. 
The Battle of Sokolovo ended in a political and moral victory for Czechoslovak forces.
French nationalist politician François de La Rocque was arrested in Clermont-Ferrand, by the SIPO-SD German police, along with 152 high ranking Parti Social Français members in Paris, on charges of trying to convince Philippe Pétain to go to North Africa. 
Born:  
Bobby Fischer, American chess player, World Champion 1972 to 1975; in Chicago (d. 2008) 
Charles Gibson, American TV news anchorman; in Evanston, Illinois
Died: Harold James Suggars, 65, "the last of the X-ray martyrs".  Suggars had suffered for 41 years from "x-ray dermatitis", a slow and painful deterioration from his exposure to x-rays while developing radiological devices.

March 10, 1943 (Wednesday)
The Soviet Union established "Laboratory No. 2", the secret atomic energy research facility, with Igor Kurchatov as the lab's "chief".
Banco Bradesco, at one time the largest bank in Brazil, was founded by Amador Aguiar in the city of Marília.
Germany announced new rationing of nonessential goods, prohibiting the manufacture of suits, costumes, bath salts, and firecrackers, and restricting telephone use and photography.
The German submarine U-633 was rammed and sunk in the Atlantic Ocean by the British freighter Scorton.
The comedy film It Ain't Hay starring Abbott and Costello was released.
Died: Tully Marshall (William Phillips), 78, American character actor of stage and film

March 11, 1943 (Thursday)
The Lend-lease program was extended by the United States for another year after President Roosevelt signed legislation into law.  Earlier in the day, the U.S. Senate voted 82–0 in favor of the resolution, and the day before, the House had approved it 407–6.
Inventor John C. Donnelly received acknowledgment for his development of dehydrated foods.
The entire Jewish population of the Yugoslavian cities of Skopje, Štip and Bitola— all three now part of the Republic of Macedonia— was deported to German's Treblinka II death camp by the German SS with the assistance of Bulgarian soldiers, with 7,240 being shipped out.  The day before, the Jewish community in Bitola had been warned by the local Communist Party about the impending raid, though only a few were able to escape.
The British destroyer HMS Harvester was sunk by the U-432, a German submarine.  U-432 was then rammed and sunk by a French ship, the corvette Aconit, which rescued the few survivors of the Harvester.  The day before, the Harvester had sunk another German sub, the U-444.   There were 41 men lost on U-444, 26 on U-432, and 145 on the Harvester.

March 12, 1943 (Friday)
The Soviet 5th Army captured Vyazma.
British destroyer HMS Lightning was sunk off Algeria by German motor torpedo boats.
The British submarine Turbulent was probably sunk by a naval mine off Sardinia.
The German submarine U-130 was sunk west of the Azores by the destroyer USS Champlin.
 Italian occupying forces abandoned the Greek town of Karditsa to the partisans of ELAS.
 The village of Tsaritsani, in Greece, was razed by an Italian motorized column.  The soldiers burned 360 of the village's 600 houses and shot and killed 40 civilians.
Born: Ratko Mladic, Bosnian Serb military leader and war criminal, in Božanovići, Independent State of Croatia (now Bosnia and Herzegovina)
Died: Leonidas Harbin, 77, designer and operator of the "incline railway" at Lookout Mountain near Chattanooga, Tennessee

March 13, 1943 (Saturday)
In a plot called Operation Spark, German officer Henning von Tresckow attempted to assassinate Adolf Hitler by arranging for an unwitting officer to hand Hitler a parcel thinking it contained a gift of liquor when it actually contained a bomb. All went according to plan and Hitler's plane took off from Smolensk to Rastenburg with the parcel aboard, but it failed to explode due to a faulty detonator.

The Canadian Pacific Ocean liner RMS Empress of Canada, converted to war use, was torpedoed and sunk by the Italian submarine , 400 miles off of the coast of Africa.  The ship had been carrying 1,800 people, including Italian servicemen who had been captured as prisoners of war.  While 1,400 people survived, 392 were killed, half of them Italian POWs.
Finland signed a trade agreement with Germany and its Nazi government at Helsinki, with the Nazis providing food to the Finns in what was described by the Axis press as the "traditional Finnish-German spirit of friendship and comradeship in arms".
On Bougainville Island, Japanese troops ended their assault on American forces at Hill 700.
The German submarine U-163 was depth charged and sunk in the Atlantic Ocean by the Canadian corvette Prescott.
The final liquidation of the Kraków Ghetto was completed as German forces removed the last of the 10,000 Jews remaining in the Polish city.  
Born: André Téchiné, French film director, in Valence, Tarn-et-Garonne
Died:  
J. P. Morgan Jr., 75, multimillionaire financier and president of J.P. Morgan & Co., Inc. 
Stephen Vincent Benét, 44, American poet and writer

March 14, 1943 (Sunday)
The British submarine HMS Thunderbolt was sunk off Sicily by the Italian corvette Cicogna, killing all on board.  On June 1, 1939, as the Thetis, the submarine had been lost during sea trials with all 99 people on board, before being salvaged and relaunched as the Thunderbolt.

March 15, 1943 (Monday)
The Third Battle of Kharkov ended in German victory.
The American submarine USS Triton was shelled and sunk off Kairiru Island, New Guinea by Japanese warships.
Born:  
Sly Stone, American R & B singer, as Sylvester Stewart in Denton, Texas 
David Cronenberg, Canadian film director, in Toronto

March 16, 1943 (Tuesday)
Joseph Stalin sent a letter to President Roosevelt urging that a second front be opened in Europe. Stalin wrote, "The Soviet troops have fought strenuously all winter and are continuing to do so, while Hitler is taking important measures to rehabilitate and reinforce his Army for the spring and summer operations against the USSR; it is therefore particularly essential for us that the blow from the West no longer be delayed, that it be delivered this spring or early summer."
In the largest North Atlantic U-boat "wolfpack" attack of the war against Allied shipping, 22 merchant ships from Convoy HX 229 and Convoy SC 122 were sunk.  One German U-boat was lost in the battle.

March 17, 1943 (Wednesday)
After the Japanese destroyer Akikaze Maru took 39 Catholic missionaries from Kairiru Island off New Guinea, the order was given for their execution. Over a three-hour period, the missionaries, most of whom were German, were shot to death and their bodies dumped into the ocean.
Bulgaria, an Axis power allied with Germany, refused to comply with a German demand that Bulgarian Jews be deported to Nazi concentration camps. The Parliament voted unanimously to revoke plans that had been made by government minister Alexander Belev to arrest Bulgaria's Jewish citizens (although deportations had taken place in the conquered territories of Macedonia and Thrace). "As a result of these protests," it was observed, "no Bulgarian Jews were deported to the gas chambers from Bulgaria itself."
Irish Prime Minister Éamon de Valera made the speech "The Ireland That We Dreamed Of" on the radio on St. Patrick's Day.
The first research flight took place at the National Advisory Committee for Aeronautics' Aircraft Engine Research Laboratory (now the Glenn Research Center) in Cleveland, Ohio. The airplane conducting the flight was a Martin B-26 Marauder.
The Washington Bears, an all-black basketball team, defeated the all-white Oshkosh All-Stars, 43–31, to win the championship of the World Professional Basketball Tournament, held in Chicago. The victory completed a season in which the Bears won all 41 of their games.
Born: Bakili Muluzi, President of Malawi from 1994 to 2004, in Machinga.

March 18, 1943 (Thursday)
German forces recaptured Kharkov, the Ukrainian SSR territory that had been briefly taken by the Soviet Red Army.
The pro-Vichy administration in French Guiana was overthrown by a pro-Allied committee.
Deportation of Jews began from Thrace, which had been added to the Kingdom of Bulgaria after being conquered by German and Bulgarian soldiers, with the first convoy passing through Bulgaria on the way to the Treblinka extermination camp in Poland.

Fritz Kuhn, the German born leader of the American Nazi movement, was revoked of his United States citizenship by the U.S. District Court in New York City.  Kuhn, who had once led the German American Bund, had been incarcerated at the Clinton Prison at Dannemora, New York, after having been convicted of embezzling the Bund's treasury.
German police arrested the alleged serial killer Bruno Lüdke.
The drama film Keeper of the Flame starring Spencer Tracy and Katharine Hepburn, was released.
Born: Kevin Dobson, American TV actor, in Queens, New York City

March 19, 1943 (Friday)
The Sigurimi, the secret police agency for Albania, was organized by Communist resistance leader Enver Hoxha, initially to gather intelligence in the partisan fight against the Italian occupation forces.  After Albania was freed from the Axis powers, Hoxha would use the Sigurimi force to prevent any organized dissent against his regime; the secret police force would be disbanded in 1991.
The German submarine U-5 sank west of Pillau in a diving accident. Sixteen of her 37 crew were lost.
The German submarine U-384 was sunk west of Malin Head by a B-17 of No. 206 Squadron RAF.
Born:  
Mario J. Molina, Mexican chemist, and 1995 Nobel Prize in Chemistry laureate, in Mexico City  (d. 2020)
Mario Monti, Prime Minister of Italy 2011 - 2013, in Varese
Died: Frank Nitti, 57, Italian-American gangster and enforcer for Al Capone, by suicide.

March 20, 1943 (Saturday)
The Japanese Navy ordered its submarine forces to leave no survivors on the sinking of any merchant vessels, with the text "Do not stop at the sinking of enemy ships and cargoes.  At the same time, carry out the complete destruction of the crews of the enemy's ships."
The first of 19 transports of 46,000 Greek Jews to Nazi death camps began, as a train left Salonika for the Auschwitz extermination camp.  By August 18, the removal of the Jews would be complete.
Born: Gerard Malanga, American poet and photographer, in the Bronx
Died: R. Dudley Pope, American inventor who had perfected the parachute for the U.S. armed forces.  Pope had been testing his design for a parachute that would open automatically at 2,000 feet, and had leaped from an altitude of 12,000 feet near Seattle.  Pope's invention, and a backup parachute, both failed to open.

March 21, 1943 (Sunday)
The second attempt on Hitler's life in the space of eight days was made, this time by Rudolf Christoph Freiherr von Gersdorff, who had been given the opportunity to escort Hitler through an exhibition of captured Soviet war equipment at the Zeughaus in Berlin. Gersdorff, who had expected Hitler to spend at least thirty minutes by his side at the Zeughaus, set a ten-minute fuse on a time bomb and made plans to kill himself and Hitler in a suicide bombing.  Instead, Hitler rushed through the viewing and left after two minutes; Gersdorff bid his goodbyes, then went into a restroom and defused the explosive.
The Soviet submarine K-3 was depth charged and sunk off Båtsfjord, Norway by German submarine chasers.
Born:  
Vivian Stanshall, English comedian, writer, artist, broadcaster, and musician, as Victor Stanshall in Oxford (d. 1995) 
István Gyulai, Hungarian athlete and General Secretary of the IAAF 1991–2006, in Budapest (d. 2006)

March 22, 1943 (Monday)
Deportation began of 4,000 Jews in Nazi-occupied France.  The prisoners were sent by train from the Drancy internment camp, near Paris, to the Sobibor extermination camp in Poland, and 1,000 were sent two days later.  All but 15 were sent to gas chambers upon their arrival, and only five of the 4,000 survived World War II.
On the same day, deportation began of the Jews of the Yugoslavian (now Macedonian) city of Skopje, as 2,338 people were loaded onto freight cars for the one-week-long train trip to the Treblinka death camp.  Two more transports left on March 29 and April 5, carrying 2,402 and 2,404 Jews respectively.
The first executions of Gypsies by the Nazi SS were carried out at the Auschwitz concentration camp, with 1,700 being sent to gas chambers after being diagnosed with typhus.
In the Khatyn massacre, the entire population of the Belarusan village of Khatyn was attacked by German soldiers of the 36th Waffen Grenadier Division of the SS, commanded by Oskar Dirlewanger, in retaliation for the killing of four Nazi officers.  The Dirlewanger Brigade burned down the village and killed 156 of its 160 residents.  Only three children and one man survived. A memorial was later placed on the site while the Byelorussian SSR was a republic of the Soviet Union.
The German submarines U-524 and U-665 were both sunk in the Atlantic Ocean by Allied aircraft.
Born:  
Bruno Ganz, Swiss film actor, in Zurich (died 2019); 
Keith Relf, British rock musician (The Yardbirds), Rock and Roll Hall of Fame inductee; in Richmond, London (accidentally electrocuted, 1976)
Died:  
Hans Woellke, 32, German track athlete and 1936 Olympic gold medalist, while serving as a security policeman in German-occupied Poland 
Colonel Edward Orlando Kellett, 40, British MP, big game hunter and Royal Armoured Corps officer, in battle in Tunisia.

March 23, 1943 (Tuesday)

A combination of hydrocodone and acetaminophen, known by various trade names including Vicodin and Lortab, was first approved for use in the United States by the Food and Drug Administration.
The British troopship RMS Windsor Castle was torpedoed and sunk off Algiers by a German Heinkel He 111 aircraft.
Parliamentary elections were allowed in Denmark by Werner Best and the Nazi occupation authorities.  The Social Democratic Party won 66 of the 148 seats available, and the Danish Nazi party candidates received only 3.3% of the vote.
The Xerces Blue butterfly (Glaucopsyche xerces) was seen for the last time, and is presumed to have become extinct, its habitat in the sand dunes near San Francisco Bay having been destroyed by the growth of the California city.
British Commandos carried out Operation Roundabout, a raid on a bridge over a Norwegian fjord, but the mission was unsuccessful when one of the accompanying Norwegian soldiers dropped the magazine for his machine gun and alerted the German guards.

March 24, 1943 (Wednesday)
Ata al-Ayyubi was named as the interim President of Syria by the French military administrator, General Georges Catroux, until elections could be held in July. 
Lt. General John L. DeWitt, the U.S. Army administrator overseeing the Japanese American internment, eased restrictions of movement, but issued regulations putting an 8:00 pm to 6:00 am curfew on all people of Japanese ancestry.  The curfew would be upheld by the United States Supreme Court in Hirabayashi v. United States, 320 U.S. 81 (1943).
Died: U.S. Army Colonel H. Weir Cook, 50, American fighter ace, when his P-39 plane crashed during a mission in New Caledonia.  The airport in Indianapolis was later renamed in his honor.

March 25, 1943 (Thursday)
German Foreign Minister Joachim von Ribbentrop warned Henrik Ramsay, the visiting Foreign Minister of Finland, that the Nazi regime would not tolerate Finland's withdrawal from the Axis powers, nor any attempt by Finland to negotiate peace terms with the Allied powers. 
The go-ahead for construction of the Blockhaus d'Éperlecques was approved by Adolf Hitler.  Located in France near Watten and the English Channel, the "blockhaus" was a hardened bunker with walls 12 feet thick, the first of three constructed to house Germany's V-2 missiles.
The German submarine U-469 was depth charged and sunk in the Atlantic Ocean by a B-17 of No. 206 Squadron RAF.
Born: Paul Michael Glaser, American TV actor (Starsky and Hutch), in Cambridge, Massachusetts

March 26, 1943 (Friday)
The Battle of the Komandorski Islands began in the Aleutian Islands, when United States Navy forces intercepted a convoy of Japanese transports and ships attempting to bring troops to Kiska.  The American force of two cruisers and four destroyers was commanded by Rear Admiral Charles H. McMorris, while the Japanese convoy of five destroyers and four cruisers was led by Admiral Boshiro Hosogaya.  The two sides fired shells at each other across a distance of no more than eight miles, without the use of submarines or airplanes, in what historian Samuel Eliot Morison described as "a naval battle that has no parallel in the Pacific War".  Although no ships were sunk in the four-hour battle, Admiral Hosogaya ordered his fleet to turn back and "no further Japanese convoys were to reach the Aleutians".
A committee, chaired by U.S. Undersecretary of State Sumner Welles, submitted a proposed charter for a "world security association" to be set up by the world's nations after the end of World War II.  The proposal resembled the United Nations Organization that would be created in 1945, with a "General Conference" of all nations, an Executive Committee consisting of the U.S., the U.K., the U.S.S.R. and China, and a middle tier of the four Committee powers and seven other nations representing different regions of the world.  The UNO would combine the two committees into one Security Council, with five permanent members given a veto power, and ten non-voting members drawn on a rotating basis from the other members.
Born: Bob Woodward, American investigative reporter and author, in Geneva, Illinois

March 27, 1943 (Saturday)
The British escort carrier Dasher was destroyed by an accidental explosion in the Firth of Clyde, killing 379 of the crew of 528.  An investigation concluded that the cause had been "a carelessly dropped cigarette" that had ignited fuel from a leaking valve on the ship's tanks.
The U.S. Department of War released the news of a successful new weapon for the U.S. Army, the bazooka.  In a statement, the War Department said that "It is revolutionary in design.  It can be carted about in a jeep or a peep, or carried by two men at a dog trot.  It hurls a high explosive projectile... It will shatter cast steel and such material as bridge girders and railroad rails and perform other seeming miracles.  Before long, the 'bazooka' will be heard from on all fronts."  The weapon had secretly been demonstrated to news reporters in December, on condition that it could not be written about at the time.
In the heaviest air raid on the German capital up to that time, 1,000 tons of bombs were dropped on Berlin by Britain's Royal Air Force in three waves of 100 bombers each.
The German submarine U-169 was depth charged and sunk in the North Atlantic by a B-17 of No. 206 Squadron RAF.

March 28, 1943 (Sunday)
At Naples, the munitions ship Caterina Costa exploded in the harbor of the Italian city.  Initial reports were that 72 people were killed and 1,179 injured, while later sources set the death toll at 600 or more.  The fire on the ship had burned for hours, but no action was taken on fighting the blaze or towing the ship away from the harbor, because government approval could not be obtained to take action.
The German submarine U-77 was sunk off Calp, Spain by two British Lockheed Hudson aircraft.
Died:  
Sergei Rachmaninoff, 70, Russian classical composer and U.S. citizen, of cancer 
Ben Davies, 85, Welsh opera tenor 
Sundara Sastri Satyamurti, 55, Indian independence activist

March 29, 1943 (Monday)
Food rationing began in the United States following the March 12 announcement of limits on beef, pork, lamb and mutton, as well as butter, cheese and canned fish.  Poultry was not affected by the order.
The New Zealand 2nd Infantry Division entered the Tunisian city of Gabès.
Given a choice between placing Germany's new V-2 missiles on mobile rocket launchers or in bunkers near Peenemünde, Adolf Hitler rejected German Army recommendations and opted for the fixed locations for the Nazi weapon. 
Born:  
John Major, Prime Minister of the United Kingdom (1990–1997), in Sutton and Cheam 
Eric Idle, English comedian, in South Shields 
Vangelis (Evangelos Papathanassiou), Greek musician and film score composer known for the theme to Chariots of Fire; in Volos (d. 2022)

March 30, 1943 (Tuesday)
Near Camden, South Carolina, the men of the 505th Parachute Infantry regiment bailed out in "the first mass parachute jump" in American history, with 2,000 soldiers in the sky at once.
The German submarine U-416 struck a mine and sank in the Baltic Sea. The sub would be raised, repaired and returned to service.
The University of Wyoming Cowboys won the NCAA basketball tournament with a 46–34 victory over the Georgetown University Hoyas.
Died: Sister Maria Restituta, 48, Austrian Roman Catholic nun, was beheaded on orders of Martin Bormann, becoming the only nun in Nazi Germany to receive the death sentence.  She would be beatified in 1998.

March 31, 1943 (Wednesday)
Oklahoma!, the musical by Richard Rodgers and Oscar Hammerstein II, opened on Broadway.  Ten years later, Oklahoma! would be described as "a new musical that broke all the rules: it had no big-name stars, no bare-legged chorus and, worst of all, it contained a 'high-brow' ballet.".  The show went on to become Broadway's longest-running musical up to that time, closing in 1948.  
In North Africa, Axis forces withdrew from Cap Serrat while 5th Corps of the 1st British Army captured El Aouana.
Born: Christopher Walken, American actor, in Queens, New York City
Died: Pavel Milyukov, 84, Russian politician and journalist

References

1943
1943-03
1943-03